Wyoming Highway 290 (WYO 290) is a  east-west Wyoming state road located in southern Park County, providing access to areas west of Meeteetse.

Route description
Wyoming Highway 290 begins its western end at Park CR 4IX (Pitchfork Road) and Park CR 5XS, approximately 11 miles west of Meeteetse, near the Marathon Pitchfork oil fields.  Highway 290 travels eastward along the south bank of the Greybull River which it will roughly parallel for its entire routing. WYO 290 passes north of the Lower Sunshine Reservoir and then  crosses Wood River at just over 5 miles. As WYO 290 nears Meeteetse, it turns to travel more northeasterly and enters the town from the south. At 11.23 miles, it reaches its eastern terminus at Wyoming Highway 120 in Meeteetse.

Major intersections

References

External links 

Wyoming State Routes 200-299
WYO 290 - WYO 120 to Park County Route 4IX

Transportation in Park County, Wyoming
290